The year 2021 is the 240th year of the Rattanakosin Kingdom of Thailand. It is the sixth year in the reign of King Vajiralongkorn (Rama X), and is reckoned as year 2564 in the Buddhist Era.

Incumbents
 King: Vajiralongkorn 
 Prime Minister: Prayut Chan-o-cha
 Supreme Patriarch: Ariyavongsagatanana IX

Events
Ongoing — COVID-19 pandemic in Thailand

Scheduled events 
21 to 30 May – Scheduled date for the 2021 Asian Indoor and Martial Arts Games, hosted by Bangkok and Chonburi.

Deaths
3 February – Pong Sarasin, conglomerate executive and politician, former Deputy Prime Minister (born 1927).
7 September – Thanwa Raseetanu, luk thung singer (born 1970).

References

 

 
2020s in Thailand
Years of the 21st century in Thailand
Thailand
Thailand